is a private university in Takatsuki, Osaka, Japan. The precursor of the school was founded in 1927, and it was chartered as a university in 1946. In 2021, it was renamed  due to the integration with the Osaka University of Pharmaceutical Sciences.

External links 
  in Japanese
  in English

Private universities and colleges in Japan
Educational institutions established in 1927
Universities and colleges in Osaka Prefecture
1927 establishments in Japan
Medical schools in Japan